Waitress! is a 1981 American comedy film directed by Lloyd Kaufman and Michael Herz of Troma Entertainment. It was the second in Troma's line of "sexy comedies", preceded by the 1979's Squeeze Play! and followed by 1982's Stuck on You! and 1983's The First Turn-On!

Premise
The film follows an aspiring actress working as a waitress as she deals with a variety of crazy customers, drunken chefs and other zany hurdles.

References

External links
 

1981 films
1980s sex comedy films
American sexploitation films
American independent films
Films directed by Lloyd Kaufman
Troma Entertainment films
American sex comedy films
1981 directorial debut films
1981 comedy films
1980s English-language films
1980s American films